The world's busiest ports include:

List of busiest ports by cargo tonnage
List of countries by container port traffic
List of busiest container ports
List of busiest cruise ports by passengers